Chekonidhara is a census town in Jorhat district  in the state of Assam, India.

Demographics
 India census, Chekonidhara had a population of 7315. Males constitute 50% of the population and females 50%. Chekonidhara has an average literacy rate of 85%, higher than the national average of 59.5%; with male literacy of 85% and female literacy of 84%. 8% of the population is under 6 years of age.

References

Cities and towns in Jorhat district
Jorhat